In mathematics, a Rickart space (after Charles Earl Rickart), also called a basically disconnected space, is a topological space in which open σ-compact subsets have compact open closures.  named them after , who  showed that Rickart spaces are related to monotone σ-complete C*-algebras in the same way that  Stonean spaces are related to AW*-algebras.

Rickart spaces are totally disconnected and sub-Stonean spaces.

References

Properties of topological spaces